Lobatos is an unincorporated community in Conejos County, in the U.S. state of Colorado.

History
A post office called Lobatos was established in 1902, and remained in operation until 1920.  Lobatos is a name derived from Spanish meaning "wolf cubs".

References

Unincorporated communities in Conejos County, Colorado
Unincorporated communities in Colorado